Joseph Fan may refer to:

Joseph Fan Heng'an (1882–1962), Chinese Roman Catholic bishop in Jining (Inner Mongolia)
Joseph Fan Zhongliang (1918–2014), Chinese Roman Catholic bishop in Shanghai

See also
Peter Joseph Fan Xueyan (1907–1992), Chinese Roman Catholic bishop in Baoding